Fraxinus malacophylla is a species of ash tree native to China, where it is found in Guangxi and Yunnan provinces, and Thailand.

References

malacophylla